In Aztec mythology,  ("star garment"), also  and , was a creator goddess who created the stars along with her husband, the Milky Way, Earth, and also death and darkness.  This pair of gods are sometimes associated with the first pair of humans, Nata and Nena.

In ,  is the Lord of the Day for days that land on the 13th of the month.

Also see 
 Omecihuatl

References

Aztec goddesses
Stellar goddesses
Creator goddesses